Nick Marino is managing editor at Paste magazine and a former pop music critic at the Atlanta Journal-Constitution.  In addition to Paste and the AJC, his work has appeared in several other music entertainment publications, including Entertainment Weekly, Spin and CMJ.

References 

Year of birth missing (living people)
Living people
People from Atlanta
American music critics